Jystrup is a small town with a population of 781 (1 January 2022) located in the middle of Zealand, Denmark. It is located in Ringsted municipality in Region Zealand.

Known for its nearby Danish Tramway Museum of Skjoldenæsholm, the town is also close to a golf course and camping site.

The town has the postal code 4174 Jystrup, Midtsjælland.

Notable people  
 Per Gundmann (1906 in Jystrup – 1967) a Danish stage and film actor

References

External links
Jystrup Net 
Jystrup Landsbyforening
Søholmskolen
Børnehaven Søholmen
Jystrup Aftenskole
Gaudi Galleriet
Sporvejsmuseet
Søholmscenen
Jystrup IF
Skjoldenæsholm Golfklub
Skjodenæsholm Skov
Skjoldenæsholm Gods

Cities and towns in Region Zealand
Ringsted Municipality